The following is a list of colleges and universities in the U.S. state of Pennsylvania.

Among public institutions, the Commonwealth System of Higher Education includes semi-public state-related colleges and universities. The Pennsylvania State System of Higher Education consists of state-owned master's level institutions.

Defunct institutions
Includes all not-for-profit schools that have closed since 1960.
 Allegheny University of the Health Sciences (1994–2002) – formed via a merger of Hahnemann Medical College and The Medical College of Pennsylvania; now a part of Drexel University College of Medicine
 Alliance College (1948–1987) – baccalaureate university in Cambridge Springs (Crawford County)
 Combs College of Music (1885–1990) – master's music school in Philadelphia
 Crozer Theological Seminary (1857–1970) – Baptist seminary in Upland (Delaware County)
 Dropsie College (1907–1986) – graduate school of Jewish studies; merged with the University of Pennsylvania to become the Center for Advanced Judaic Studies
 Hahnemann Medical College (1849–1994) – merged with The Medical College of Pennsylvania; now a part of Drexel University College of Medicine
 Hershey Junior College (1938–1965) – associate's college in Derry Township (Dauphin County)
 Mary Immaculate Seminary (1939–1990) – Roman Catholic seminary in Lehigh Township (Northampton County)
 Northeastern Christian Junior College (1957–1993) – Bible college affiliated with the Churches of Christ, located in Lower Merion Township (Montgomery County)
 Medical College of Pennsylvania (1850–1994) – merged with Hahnemann Medical College; now a part of Drexel University College of Medicine
 Penn Hall Junior College (1906–1973) – associate's college in Chambersburg
 Pennsylvania College of Podiatric Medicine (1963–1998) – merged with Temple University to become the Temple University School of Podiatric Medicine
 Philadelphia University (1884-2017) - Merged with Thomas Jefferson University
 Pinebrook Junior College (1914–1992) – nondenominational Bible college in Coopersburg (Lehigh County)
 Saint Fidelis Seminary (1877–1979) – baccalaureate Roman Catholic university in Summit Township (Butler County)
 Saint Pius X Seminary (1967–2004) – Roman Catholic seminary in Dalton
 Spring Garden College (1851–1992) – baccalaureate university in Philadelphia
 United Wesleyan College (1921–1990) – Bible college affiliated with the Wesleyan Church, located in Allentown
 Villa Marie College (1925–1989) – baccalaureate Roman Catholic university in Erie; merged with Gannon University

See also

 List of college athletic programs in Pennsylvania
 List of for-profit colleges and universities in Pennsylvania
 List of colleges and universities in Philadelphia
 List of colleges and universities in Pittsburgh
 Higher education in the United States
 List of American institutions of higher education
 List of recognized higher education accreditation organizations
 List of colleges and universities
 List of colleges and universities by country

References

External links
Department of Education listing of accredited institutions in Pennsylvania

Pennsylvania
Universities and colleges